The Yamaha Raptor 700R is a full-size all terrain vehicle (ATV) or quad bike. The Raptor 700R is Yamaha's second generation of the Raptor (first gen being the Raptor 660) and is powered by a 686cc single cylinder overhead cam electronically fuel injected engine, with electric start and a five-speed manual transmission with a single-speed reverse.

Specifications

References

External links 
Yamaha Motor Corporation

Raptor 700R